A. Chakravarti (17 May 1880 – 12 February 1960), who served the Indian Educational Service (IES), was a professor of philosophy at the Presidency College in Chennai, India. He is known for translating the Tirukkural into English.

Biography
Chakravarti served the Indian Educational Services for several years. He was the chief professor of philosophy at the Presidency College in Chennai. He retired from IES as the principal of the Government College at Kumbakonam. In appreciation of his services, the British government honoured him with the title "Rao Bhaghadur."

Chakravarti translated the Tirukkural into English in prose and published it in 1953 under the title "Tirukkural" published by the Diocesan Press, Madras. His translation consists of four aspects: the original couplets of the Kural text in Tamil script, transliteration in Roman script, translation of the literature in modern English prose, and his comments on the thematic aspects of the original literature. Scholars consider his translation faithful to the original.

See also

 Tirukkural translations
 Tirukkural translations into English
 List of translators into English

References

Further reading
 Manavalan, A. A. (2010). A Compendium of Tirukkural Translations in English (4 vols.). Chennai: Central Institute of Classical Tamil, .

Tamil–English translators
Translators of the Tirukkural into English
1880 births
1960 deaths
20th-century translators
Academic staff of Presidency College, Chennai
Tirukkural translators